Puliyur Subramaniam Narayanaswamy (or Narayanaswami; 24 February 1934 – 16 October 2020) was a Carnatic music vocalist.

Career
He learnt music from Tiruppambaram Somasundaram Pillai, T. M. Thiagarajan and later from Semmangudi Srinivasa Iyer. He was also a highly acclaimed teacher.

He was awarded the Bala Gana Kala Rathnam at the age of 12. He worked in All India Radio.
In 1999, he was conferred the title, 'Sangita Kala Acharya' by the Music Academy. He was awarded `Padma Bhushan' by the Government of India in 2003. His well known disciples include (alphabetically) A.s.Murali, Akshay Padmanabhan, Abhishek Raghuram, Akkarai Sisters, Amritha Murali, Bharathi Ramasubban, C.R.Vaithyanathan, Gayathri Venkataraghavan, Kalavathy Avadhooth,  Kunnakudi Balamuralikrishna, Nisha Rajagopalan, Ranjani-Gayatri sisters, 
Sunil Gargeyan, Janani Iyer, and Prithvi Harish

He died on 16 October 2020 from COVID-19.

References

External links
 
 Carnatic P.S Narayanaswamy
 P. S. Narayanaswamy
 P. S. Narayanaswami - Torchbearer of the Semmangudi Bani, Part 1
 P. S. Narayanaswami - Torchbearer of the Semmangudi Bani, Part 2

1934 births
Male Carnatic singers
Carnatic singers
2020 deaths
Recipients of the Padma Bhushan in arts
Singers from Chennai
All India Radio people
Recipients of the Sangeet Natak Akademi Award
Deaths from the COVID-19 pandemic in India